Yulyan Rusev (31 July 1949 – 28 July 1974) was a Bulgarian swimmer. He competed in two events at the 1968 Summer Olympics.

References

External links
 

1949 births
1974 deaths
Bulgarian male swimmers
Olympic swimmers of Bulgaria
Swimmers at the 1968 Summer Olympics
Sportspeople from Varna, Bulgaria
20th-century Bulgarian people